The saffron-cowled blackbird (Xanthopsar flavus) is a species of bird in the family Icteridae, in the monotypic genus Xanthopsar.
It is found in Argentina, Brazil, Paraguay, and Uruguay (where it is found at the Quebrada de los Cuervos).

Its natural habitats are subtropical or tropical dry lowland grassland, subtropical or tropical seasonally wet or flooded lowland grassland, and pastureland.

It is threatened by habitat loss.

References

saffron-cowled blackbird
Birds of Argentina
Birds of the Atlantic Forest
Birds of Paraguay
Birds of Uruguay
saffron-cowled blackbird
saffron-cowled blackbird
Taxonomy articles created by Polbot